William S. Lasdon (1896 – December 9, 1984) was an American pharmaceutical executive and philanthropist.

Early life
William S. Lasdon was born to a Jewish family in Brooklyn, New York in 1896. He was one of seven children including brothers Jacob S. Lasdon, Philip S. Lasdon, Milton Lasdon, Stanley S. Lasdon, and sisters Mrs. Francis Milch and Mrs. Miriam Gerrity.

Philanthropy
Lasdon was president of the eponymous foundation which he and his family formed in 1946. The Lasdon Foundation and subsequent generations of family trusts have been major supporters of medical research and the arts in New York. Lasdon was also a member of the board of overseers of the Albert Einstein College of Medicine and a director of the Cerebral Palsy Association and the Boys Clubs of America.

Personal life
Lasdon married Mildred D. Silverman in 1922 and had a son Robert Lasdon and a daughter, philanthropist Nanette L. Laitman. Their former country estate is now the Lasdon Park and Arboretum.

References

 

1896 births
1984 deaths
20th-century American Jews
People from Brooklyn
Philanthropists from New York (state)